The fourth season of the American television series Tough as Nails premiered on CBS on January 4, 2023, and concluded on February 22, 2023. The season was won by concrete form setter Jorge Zavala, with welder Mister Frost finishing second, and pipeline laborer Jake Cope placing third.

Cast

Cast progress

 The contestant won Tough as Nails.
 The contestant was declared the first runner-up.
 The contestant was declared the second runner-up.
 The contestant placed the highest in the individual competition and won the challenge.
 The contestant placed the second highest in the individual competition and was ultimately declared safe.
 The contestant was safe from elimination.
 The contestant placed the second lowest in the individual competition but was ultimately declared safe.
 The contestant placed the lowest in the individual competition and competed in the overtime challenge but ultimately survived.
 The contestant was the loser of the overtime challenge and was eliminated from the individual competition.

Team progress

 Won the team challenge.
 Lost the team challenge.

Production
On April 14, 2021, CBS announced that Tough as Nails was renewed for a third and a fourth season. The fourth season was filmed during November 2021. On November 14, 2022, it was announced that the season would premiere on January 4, 2023. The first episode of the season took place on Catalina Island.

Episodes

References

2023 American television seasons
Tough as Nails